Larry E. McKibben (born January 5, 1947, in Marshalltown, Iowa) was the Iowa State Senator from the 22nd District. He had served in the Iowa Senate since 1997 and was an assistant minority leader until he retired in 2008.  He received his B.A. (1970) from the University of Northern Iowa and his J.D. (1972) from the University of Iowa College of Law.  He was admitted to the Iowa bar in 1973. McKibben served on several committees in the Iowa Senate - the Commerce committee; the State Government committee; the Veterans Affairs committee; the Judiciary committee, where he was ranking member; and the Ways and Means committee, where he was ranking member.  He also served on the Transportation, Infrastructure, and Capitals Appropriations Subcommittee.  McKibben was a candidate for the United States House of Representatives, District 3, in 1998. McKibben was re-elected in 2004 with 14,185 votes (51%), defeating Democratic opponent Wayne Sawtelle. He did not rerun in the 2008 Iowa Senate elections. From 2013 to 2019, McKibben served as a member of the Iowa Board of Regents. In 2017, he considered running for the board presidency, as Bruce Rastetter decided to step down. Michael Richards was elected to succeed Rastetter as board president.

Publications
Granting Parole in Iowa: A Time for Change, Iowa Advocate, Vol. X, No. 3, Spring, 1972

References

External links
Iowa General Assembly - Senator Larry McKibben official government website
Project Vote Smart - Larry McKibben profile
Follow the Money - Larry McKibben
2006 2004 2002 2000 1998 campaign contributions
Iowa Senate Republicans - Larry McKibben profile
Campaign website

Republican Party Iowa state senators
Living people
Iowa lawyers
University of Northern Iowa alumni
University of Iowa College of Law alumni
1947 births
Politicians from Marshalltown, Iowa